Slender Means Society is an independent record label founded in 2004 by Zac Pennington, vocalist for the band Parenthetical Girls. The label's premier release was Parenthetical Girls' debut, "(((GRRRLS)))", in 2004. The label has since released records by the likes of The Blow, Final Fantasy, Thanksgiving, Lucky Dragons, Love Letter Band, The Dead Science, Xiu Xiu, PWRFL POWER, Idol Fodder, and Grouper.

Discography

 SMS000 Parenthetical Girls – (((GRRRLS)))
 SMS001 The Blow – Poor Aim: Love Songs (co-release with States Rights Records)
 SMS002 Thanksgiving – The Ghost & The Eyes w/ Trees in the Ground, Outside the Window (co-release with States Rights Records)
 SMS003 Lucky Dragons – Nortenas (co-release with States Rights Records)
 SMS004 Love Letter Band – This World Be My Church (co-release with States Rights Records)
 SMS005 Parenthetical Girls – Safe as Houses
 SMS006 The Dead Science – Crepuscule with the Dead Science
 SMS007 Xiu Xiu vs. Grouper – Creepshow (co-release with States Rights Records)
 SMS008 Idol Fodder – Bäbytalk (co-release with States Rights Records)
 SMS009 PWRFL POWER – PWRFL POWER
 SMS010 Parenthetical Girls – Entanglements (co-release with Tomlab)
 SMS011 Final Fantasy – Plays To Please
 SMS012a Parenthetical Girls – Privilege, pt. I: On Death & Endearments
 SMS012b Parenthetical Girls – Privilege, pt. II: The Past, Imperfect

External links
 Official site

Oregon record labels
American independent record labels
Record labels established in 2004
Indie rock record labels
Privately held companies based in Oregon
2004 establishments in Oregon